The 21st Aircraft Carrier Squadron  also called Twenty First Aircraft Carrier Squadron was a Royal Navy aircraft carrier formation from March 1945 to December 1945. 

During its existence the squadron's usual composition varied depending on its operational orders. It included a Dido-class light cruiser that served as its flagship, four to five escort carriers of the Attacker-class and Ruler-class, as well as four supporting destroyers of different classes. During Operation Dracula the squadron also included a second cruiser of the Dido class in support of the main force.

History
The 21st Aircraft Carrier Squadron was established in March 1945 as part of reinforcements sent to the Indian Ocean and was assigned to the East Indies Fleet. On 25 April 1945 the squadron took part in Operation Dracula as part of Force W along with the 3rd Battle Squadron. Its responsibility was to provide daylight air cover during the initial stages of the operation until May 1945. From 10 August 1945 to 15 August 1945 it took part in Operation Carson as a component of Force 61. The squadron remained in existence until December 1945 when it was disbanded.

Commanders

Composition

Reinforcements sent to the Indian Ocean in March 1945

Operation Dracula, April to May 1945

Operation Carson, 10 to 15 August 1945

References

Sources
 Chant, Christopher. "Carson: Operations & Codenames of WWII". codenames.info. C. Chant, 24 May 2018. 
 Kindell, Don. "East Indies Fleet War Diary 1945". Admiralty War Diaries of World War 2. www.naval-history.net. Gordon Smith, 15 July 2011. 
 Watson, Dr Graham. "Royal Navy Organization in World War 2, 1939-1945". www.naval-history.net. Gordon Smith, 19 September 2015.
 Wynn, Kenneth G. (2015). "1: Introduction". Men of The Battle of Britain: A Biographical Dictionary of The Few. Barnsley, England: Frontline Books. .

Aircraft Carrier squadrons of the Royal Navy
Military units and formations established in 1945
Military units and formations disestablished in 1945